Lawrence Aloysius Whipple (July 26, 1910 – June 8, 1983) was a United States district judge of the United States District Court for the District of New Jersey.

Education and career

Born in New York City, New York, Whipple received a Bachelor of Science degree from Columbia University in 1933 and a Bachelor of Laws from John Marshall Law School (now Seton Hall University School of Law) in 1939. He was in private practice from 1939 to 1949. He was an acting United States magistrate judge for the United States District Court for the District of New Jersey from 1949 to 1951. He was Director of Law Enforcement for the Office of Public Safety in 1950. He was a Special Assistant United States Attorney of the United States Department of Justice in 1951. He was Executive Director of the Jersey City Housing Authority in New Jersey in 1953. He was Director of Public Safety for Jersey City, New Jersey from 1953 to 1957. He was Director of the Department of Revenue and Finance for Jersey City in 1957. He was county counsel for Hudson County, New Jersey from 1957 to 1958. He was the Deputy Attorney General of New Jersey in 1958. He was a prosecutor in Hudson County from 1958 to 1962. He was a judge of the Superior Court of New Jersey from 1963 to 1967.

Federal judicial service

Whipple was nominated by President Lyndon B. Johnson on August 25, 1967, to a seat on the United States District Court for the District of New Jersey vacated by Judge Thomas Francis Meaney. He was confirmed by the United States Senate on October 12, 1967, and received his commission the same day. He served as Chief Judge from 1974 to 1978 and was a member of the Judicial Conference of the United States from 1975 to 1978. He assumed senior status on September 1, 1978 due to a certified disability, and continued in that capacity until his death.

Personal life
A resident of Sea Girt, New Jersey, Whipple died in nearby Red Bank, due to complications relating to heart surgery.

References

Sources
 

1910 births
1983 deaths
Columbia University alumni
People from Sea Girt, New Jersey
Seton Hall University School of Law alumni
Judges of the United States District Court for the District of New Jersey
United States district court judges appointed by Lyndon B. Johnson
20th-century American judges
20th-century American lawyers
United States magistrate judges